Gary F. Marcus (born February 8, 1970) is a professor emeritus of psychology and neural science at New York University and an author. In 2014 he founded Geometric Intelligence, a machine-learning company. His books include Guitar Zero, and Kluge.

Biography 
Marcus majored in cognitive science at Hampshire College. He continued on to graduate school at Massachusetts Institute of Technology, where he conducted research on negative evidence in language acquisition and regularization (and over-regularization) in children's acquisition of grammatical morphology.

Theories of language and mind 

Marcus belongs to the school of thought of psychological nativism. One of his book, The Birth of the Mind, describes the ways genes can influence cognitive development from a nativist perspective, and aims to reconcile nativism with common anti-nativist arguments advanced by other academics. In a review, Mameli and Papineau argue that the theory expounded in the book is "more sophisticated than any version of nativism on the market", but that in attempting to rebut anti-nativist arguments, Marcus "ends up reconfiguring the nativist position out of existence", prompting Mameli and Papineau to conclude that the nativist-anti-nativist framing should "be abandoned".

Research and written work 
Marcus's early work focused on why children produce over-regularizations, such as "breaked" and "goed", as a test case for the nature of mental rules. 

In his first book, The Algebraic Mind (2001), Marcus challenged the idea that the mind might consist of largely undifferentiated neural networks. He argued that understanding the mind would require integrating connectionism with classical ideas about symbol-manipulation.

In his second book, The Birth of the Mind (2004), Marcus gives a more detailed explanation of the genetic support systems of human thought. He discusses how a small number of genes account for the intricate human brain, common false impressions of genes, and the problems they may cause for the future of genetic engineering.

Marcus's book, Guitar Zero (2012), explores the process of taking up a musical instrument as adult.

Marcus edited The Norton Psychology Reader (2005), including selections by cognitive scientists on modern science of the human mind. With Jeremy Freeman he co-edited The Future of the Brain: Essays by the World's Leading Neuroscientists (2014).

Representative publications

Books / Monographs 
Marcus, G.; Davis, E. (2019). Rebooting AI: Building Artificial Intelligence We Can Trust. Pantheon/Random House.
Marcus, G.; Freeman, J. (ed.) (2014). The Future of the Brain: Essays by the World's Leading Neuroscientists. Princeton University Press.
Marcus, G. F. (2012). Guitar Zero: The New Musician and the Science of Learning. The Penguin Press.
Marcus, G. F. (2008). Kluge: The Haphazard Construction of the Human Mind. Houghton Mifflin.
Marcus, G. F. (ed.) (2006). The Norton Psychology Reader.  W. W. Norton.
Marcus, G. F. (2004). The Birth of The Mind: How a Tiny Number of Genes Creates the Complexities of Human Thought.  Basic Books.
Marcus, G. F. (2001). The Algebraic Mind: Integrating Connectionism and Cognitive Science. MIT Press.
Marcus, G. F., Pinker, S., Ullman, M., Hollander, M., Rosen, T. J., Xu, F., & Clahsen, H. (1992). Overregularization in language acquisition. Monographs of the Society for Research in Child Development, 57(4), i-178.

Peer-reviewed scientific articles 
Marcus, G. F., & Davis, E. (2013). How robust are probabilistic models of higher-level cognition? Psychological Science, 24(12), 2351–2360.
Marcus, G. F., Fernandes, K. J., & Johnson, S. P. (2007). Infant rule learning facilitated by speech. Psychological Science, 18(5), 387–391.
Marcus, G. F. (2006). Cognitive architecture and descent with modification. Cognition, 101(2), 443–465.
Marcus, G. F., & Fisher, S. E. (2003). FOXP2 in focus: what can genes tell us about speech and language? Trends in Cognitive Sciences, 7(6), 257–262.
Marcus, G. F., Vijayan, S., Bandi Rao, S., & Vishton, P. M. (1999). Rule learning by seven-month-old infants. Science, 283(5398), 77–80.
Marcus, G. F. (1998). Rethinking eliminative connectionism. Cognitive Psychology, 37(3), 243–282.
Marcus, G. F., Brinkmann, U., Clahsen, H., Wiese, R., & Pinker, S. (1995). German inflection: The exception that proves the rule. Cognitive Psychology, 29(3), 189–256.

Articles 
 Marcus, Gary, "Am I Human?: Researchers need new ways to distinguish artificial intelligence from the natural kind", Scientific American, vol. 316, no. 3 (March 2017), pp. 58–63.
 Marcus, Gary, "Artificial Confidence: Even the newest, buzziest systems of artificial general intelligence are stymied by the same old problems", Scientific American, vol. 327, no. 4 (October 2022), pp. 42–45

References

External links
Substack

Living people
1970 births
21st-century American psychologists
American cognitive scientists
Psycholinguistics
New York University faculty
Hampshire College alumni
Massachusetts Institute of Technology alumni
Artificial intelligence